The Prairie Habitat Joint Venture is a partnership between governments, organizations, and conservation groups in the provinces of Manitoba, Saskatchewan, and Alberta in Canada. It is one of four Canadian habitat joint ventures operating as part of the North American Waterfowl Management Plan, and is contiguous with the Prairie Pothole Joint Venture in the United States.

Structure
The joint venture is administered via an advisory board consisting of members from the following government agencies and independent organizations:

 Agriculture and Agri-Food Canada
 Alberta Sustainable Resource Development
 Alberta NAWMP Partnership
 Canadian Wildlife Service (part of Environment Canada)
 Ducks Unlimited Canada
 Manitoba Conservation
 Manitoba Heritage Habitat Corporation
 Nature Conservancy of Canada
 Saskatchewan Environment
 Saskatchewan Watershed Authority
 Wildlife Habitat Canada

Funding
By 2005, the Prairie Habitat Joint Venture had received $641 million in funding from several sources.

 Federal government of the United States, $198.7 million
 United States non-government, $182 million
 Federal Government of Canada, $94.4 million
 Provincial governments in Canada, $77.3 million
 Canadian not-for-profit organizations, $42.9 million
 State governments in the United States, $37.4 million
 Canadian private, corporate and other, $8.7 million
 Others, $94,000

Purpose
The program's focus areas are the prairie and aspen parkland of Manitoba, Saskatchewan, and Alberta. The Peace River parkland region in northeastern British Columbia is also a primary conservation target.

Additional programs administered by this venture include the conservation of the western boreal forest ecology in the Taiga Plains, Taiga Cordillera, Boreal Cordillera, Taiga Shield and Boreal Plains.

Activities
The venture has secured land through various programs. Approximately 55% of the required funding projected in 1989 has been received and allocated to various programs in order to secure  of land identified by provincial implementation plans to be within the scope of this venture.

Three partnership programs with Agriculture and Agri-Food Canada have led to the conversion of agricultural and environmentally sensitive land to perennial cover, consistent with the goals of the North American Waterfowl Management Plan.

A marsh monitoring program is under development, and will be implemented once adequate long-term capital and operational funding has been secured.

Notes

References

North American Waterfowl Management Plan
Nature conservation organizations based in Canada
Year of establishment missing